Christian Alexander (born April 14, 1990) is a Bulgarian-American actor, best known for his role as Kiefer Bauer on the American daytime drama General Hospital.

Life and career
Born to Bulgarian parents in Athens, Alexander is a graduate of Beverly Hills High School in Beverly Hills, California. He formerly competed in gymnastics. Alexander has appeared in a number of television series, most notably over sixty episodes of General Hospital from June 18, 2009 to April 6, 2010. In 2011, he appeared in ABC Family's The Lying Game.

Filmography

Film

Television

References

External links

1990 births
Greek emigrants to the United States
Beverly Hills High School alumni
Male actors from California
American male child actors
American male film actors
American people of Bulgarian descent
American male soap opera actors
American male television actors
Living people